Serbia is a small country situated at the crossroads of Central and Southeast Europe, covering the far southern edges of the Pannonian Plain and the central Balkans. It shares borders with Bosnia-Herzegovina, Bulgaria, Croatia, Hungary, North Macedonia, Montenegro, Romania and Albania. Serbia is landlocked, though it is able to access the Adriatic Sea through Montenegro and inland Europe and the Black Sea via the Danube.

Area and borders

Serbia's total border length amounts to : with Bosnia and Herzegovina , with Bulgaria , with Croatia , with Hungary , with North Macedonia , with Montenegro , with Romania, with Albania .   

Extreme points:
 North: 46°11'25" N (near Hajdukovo)
 South: 41°51'08" N (near Rastelica)
 East: 23°00'47" E (Senokos near Dimitrovgrad)
 West: 18°49'16" E (near Bezdan in Vojvodina)

Physical geography

Topography

Serbia's terrain ranges from fertile plains of northern Vojvodina to limestone ranges and basins in the east and ancient mountains and hills in the southeast. The north is dominated by the Danube River. The Morava River, a tributary of the Danube, flows through the more mountainous southern regions of Serbia.

The terrain of central Serbia consists chiefly of hills and low to medium-high mountains, interspersed with numerous rivers and creeks. The main communication and development line stretches southeast of Belgrade towards Niš and Skopje (in North Macedonia), along the valley formed by the Great and South Morava rivers. Most major cities, as well as the main railroad and highway, are located on or around this line. To the east of this line, in an area that is relatively sparsely populated, the terrain rises to the limestone ranges of Stara Planina and the Serbian Carpathians. To the west, mountains slowly rise towards the southwest, but do not form real ridges. Zlatibor and Kopaonik are the highest mountains of this area. 

Mountains cover the largest parts of the country. Four mountain systems meet in Serbia: the Dinaric Alps in the west cover the greatest territory, stretching from northwest to southeast. The Carpathian and Balkan Mountains stretch in a north-south direction in eastern Serbia, east of the Morava valley. Ancient mountains along the South Morava, the highest one being Besna Kobila, belong to the Rila-Rhodope mountain system.

The most significant mountains in Serbia are:
 Kopaonik
 Stara Planina
 Mokra Gora
 Besna Kobila
 Dukat
 Golija
 Suva Planina
 Gramada
 Tara
 Zlatibor

The highest peak in Serbia is  Midžor with 2169m.

Hydrology

Practically the entire territory (92%) of Serbia belongs to the Danube (Black Sea) drainage basin. Part of Kosovo (5%) belongs to the Adriatic drainage basin, chiefly via the White Drin river. The rest (3%) in Kosovo and southern Serbia belongs to Aegean basin, chiefly via the Vardar river.

The Danube flows 588 km through Serbia or as a border river (with Croatia in the northwest and Romania in the southeast). Other chief rivers in Serbia are tributaries of the Danube including the Sava (flowing from the west), Tisa (flowing from the north), Drina (flowing from the south, forming a natural border with Bosnia and Herzegovina), and Morava. Only the Morava flows nearly entirely through Serbia. Their tributaries form a dense network of smaller rivers and creeks that cover most of the country.

Due to its terrain, natural lakes in Serbia are sparse and small and most are located in Vojvodina, such as the glacial lake Palić and numerous oxbow lakes along rivers. There are, however, numerous artificial lakes, mostly due to the construction of hydroelectric dams, the biggest being Đerdap on the Danube, Perućac on the Drina, and Vlasina Lake.

The abundance of relatively unpolluted surface water and numerous underground water sources of high quality might present opportunities for exportation and economic improvement. Extensive exploitation and production of bottled water has begun only recently. Despite the country's access to these water resources, water supply to many Serbian cities is poor due to mismanagement and a lack of adequate investment in infrastructure. This is complicated by water pollution (e.g., pollution in the Ibar River from Trepča zinc-lead compounds affecting Kraljevo and the presence of natural arsenic in underground waters in Zrenjanin).

The theoretical hydroenergetic potential in Serbia is estimated to be around 17,000 GWh. Roughly 10,000 GWh or 60% of Serbia's hydroenergetic potential is generated by large power plants. The remainder could be generated in small and medium power plants (<25 MW), whose construction by the private sector may improve Serbia's economy and energy reliability.

Serbia also has a huge geothermal potential, but it is only partially and sporadically accessed. Geothermal water is primarily used for balneological purposes: there are around 60 spas in Serbia, which are seen as an opportunity to improve tourism in the country.

Climate

Climate of Serbia is moderate continental with a diversity on local level, caused by geographic location, relief, terrain exposition, presence of river and lake systems, vegetation, urbanization etc. Proximity of the mountain ranges of Alps, Carpathians, Rhodopes, as well as Adriatic Sea and Pannonian plain affect the climate. Location of river ravines and plains in the northern area of the country enable occasional deep southward protrusion of polar air masses on winters, while hot Saharan air often intrudes over the Mediterranean Sea on summers.

Annual precipitation, generally, rises with altitude. Major part of Serbia has continental precipitation regimen, with peak in the earlier summer period, except for southwest, which receives highest precipitation autumn. May–June is the rainiest month,  with the average of 12 to 13% of total annual amount. February and October have the least precipitation. Snow cover can occurs from late November to early March, and majority of days with snow cover is in January.

Annual sums of solar radiation are in the interval from 1500 to 2200 hours annually.

Surface air circulation is largely influenced by orographic lift. In warmer part of the year, winds from northwest and west prevail. In Vojvodina and Sumadija, east-southeast wind, Košava, dominates over autumn and winter. Southwestern winds prevail in mountainous part of southwestern Serbia.

Biodiversity

Serbia has five national parks and many national nature reserves encompassing 5% of the territory.

National parks
 Đerdap: (Iron Gate) 
 Tara: 
 Kopaonik: 
 Fruška Gora: 

Nature parks
 Stara Planina 
 Golija 
 Kučajske planine 
 Gornje Podunavlje 
 
Special nature reservations
 Deliblato Sands 
 Ludaš Lake 
 Obedska Pond 
 Stari Begej – Carska Bara 

Nature monuments
 Đavolja Varoš

Human geography

Serbia has 6,167 registered settlements: 207 urban and 5,960 rural.

See also 
 Geography of Vojvodina
 Regions of Serbia
 Geology of Serbia

References

External links 
 Atlas of Serbia (Wikimedia Commons)
 geoSerbia, geographic portal of Serbia
 Institute for the development of water resources "Jaroslav Černi" - Republic of Serbia Water Resources Development Master Plan
 Danube Facts and Figures: Serbia